The England women's national under-21 field hockey team represents England in women's under-21 international field hockey and is controlled by England Hockey, the governing body for field hockey in England.

Competitive Record

Junior World Cup
 1989 – 8th
 1993 – 9th
 1997 – 7th
 2001 – 8th
 2005 – 9th
 2009 – 4th
 2013 – 4th
 2016 – 7th
 2022 – 
 2023 – Qualified

EuroHockey Junior Championship
 1984 – 5th
 1988 – 
 1992 – 4th
 1996 – 4th
 1998 – 5th
 2000 –  
 2002 – 
 2004 – 
 2006 – 
 2008 – 
 2010 – 
 2012 – 
 2014 – 
 2017 – 
 2019 – 6th
 2022 – 4th

Source:

See also
 England men's national under-21 field hockey team
 England women's national field hockey team

References

Under-21
Field hockey
Women's national under-21 field hockey teams